Bogusław Zbigniew Ziętek (born October 9, 1964) is a Polish trade union activist, co-founder and leader of Free Trade Union "August 80" (Wolny Związek Zawodowy "Sierpień 80"). Between 2005 and 2017 he has been the leader of the Polish Labour Party.

Career 
He has a medium technical education. He was candidate for Sejm three times. First time in 2001 (as member of Alternatywa Ruch Społeczny), in the Gliwice electoral district he got 379 votes. In 2005 (as member of the Polish Labour Party) he got 1199 in the Sosnowiec electoral district. In 2007, again for PLP and in the same district, he got 2233 votes.

In the 2004 European Parliament election, as candidate of PLP in the Silesian constituency he got 442 votes. He tried the same in the same constituency at the 2009 election again for PLP and got 3666 votes.

On April 25, 2010 he registered his own committee for the presidential election. On May 7 National Electoral Commission registered him as candidate for the office of President of Poland. In the election he got only 0.18% of votes and did not get into the second round.

Political opinion 
Ziętek supports: taxation of clergy, abolition of immunity for the MPs, liquidation of the Senate, legalization of civil unions, liquidation of Institute of National Remembrance and Central Anticorruption Bureau.

References 
 Website of Ziętek's Electoral Committee
 Ziętek's page on National Electoral Commission's website
 Super Express
 Candidates
 Who is him?

1964 births
Living people
People from Zawiercie
Polish Labour Party - August 80 politicians
Candidates in the 2010 Polish presidential election
Polish trade unionists